Trapped by Television is a 1936 American comedy-drama crime science fiction film directed by Del Lord and starring Mary Astor, Lyle Talbot and Nat Pendleton. The film is also known as Caught by Television in the United Kingdom.

Plot
An inventor is working on his latest creation, a new form of television monitor and camera, but is struggling to complete his invention due to lack of funds. His monetary problems are compounded by an aggressive bill collector looking for payments and competition from a rival scientist. When organized crime figures are added to the mix, the desperation level rises for our intrepid inventor.

Cast
 Mary Astor as Barbara "Bobby" Blake
 Lyle Talbot as Fred Dennis
 Nat Pendleton as Rocky O'Neil
 Joyce Compton as Mae Collins
 Thurston Hall as John Curtis
 Henry Mollison as Thornton
 Wyrley Birch as Paul Turner
 Robert Strange as Standish

Accuracy
Although televisions were being made from the late 1920s, they weren't commercially available until after 1936.  The model shown in the movie was designed for the production using a back-lit projection of a moving image onto the screen. The screen was notable for its large size when actual television screens of the period were smaller. The BBC Broadcasting Service began in November 1936, four months after this movie's release.

Current condition
Although the first reel is noticeably faded on most surviving prints, the film is now in the public domain and is available for general download.

See also
 List of American films of 1936
 List of films in the public domain in the United States

External links

1936 films
1930s English-language films
American black-and-white films
1936 romantic drama films
1930s science fiction films
American romantic drama films
Films directed by Del Lord
Columbia Pictures films
American science fiction films
1930s American films